Binning may refer to:

People
Binning (surname)
William of Binning, 13th century Cistercian monk and abbott
Lord Binning is a subsidiary title of the Earls of Haddington; holders include:
Charles Hamilton, Lord Binning, (1697–1732), Scottish politician
George Baillie-Hamilton, Lord Binning, (1856–1917), British Army officer

In science 
Binning is often used as a synonym to grouping or classification. 

 Data binning: a data pre-processing technique.
 Binning (metagenomics): the process of classifying reads into different groups or taxonomies.
 Product binning: in semiconductor device fabrication, the process of categorizing finished products.
 Pixel binning: the process of combining charge from adjacent pixels in a CCD image sensor during readout.

See also
Bening (disambiguation)
Benning (disambiguation)